This is a list of the 24 appointed delegates of the European Parliament for Portugal in the 1984 to 1989 session (from 1 January 1986 till 13 September 1987), ordered by name. See 1987 European Parliament election in Portugal for the first election results.

List

References

Portugal
1986